2012 (stylized 2･0･1･2) is the 25th studio album by the Japanese heavy metal band Loudness, released on August 22, 2012. "The Voice of Metal" is about and dedicated to the late Ronnie James Dio.

Track listing

Personnel
Loudness
Minoru Niihara – vocals
Akira Takasaki – guitars, keyboards
山下　昌良 – bass
Masayuki Suzuki – drums

Production
Masatoshi Sakimoto - engineer, mixing
Haruka Shinohara, Yuko Tanabe - assistant engineers
Manfred Melchior - mastering at MM Sound, Steinhagen, Germany
Hirose Shiraishi - supervisor
Masahiro Shinoki, Keiichi Horiuchi - executive producers

References

2012 albums
Loudness (band) albums
Japanese-language albums
Tokuma Shoten albums